Alejandro Medina Mayo (born 2 January 1997) is a Spanish motorcycle racer. In 2020 he competed in the MotoE World Cup.

Career statistics

Grand Prix motorcycle racing

By season

By class

Races by year
(key) (Races in bold indicate pole position; races in italics indicate fastest lap)

References

External links

1997 births
Living people
Sportspeople from Málaga
Spanish motorcycle racers
Moto2 World Championship riders
MotoE World Cup riders